Sidney Shachnow ( – ) was a Jewish American Holocaust survivor who attained the rank of major general in United States Army. He retired in 1994, after almost 40 years of active service.

Biography

Surviving the Holocaust, a concentration camp, and anti-Semitism
Sid Shachnow was born in Kaunas, Lithuania, on November 23, 1934. At the age of seven, Shachnow was imprisoned in the Kovno Ghetto during World War II because his family was Jewish. For three years, he endured brutalities and lost almost every single one of his extended family members. To increase his prospects of survival, young Shachnow performed heavy manual labor under harsh conditions. He narrowly escaped death only days before Kovno's gruesome "Children's Action", of March 27–28, 1944, when Nazi troops rounded up all children in the camp and marched them to The Ninth Fort for execution or to Auschwitz to be gassed. After escaping the ghetto, Shachnow lived in hiding for months, almost dying from starvation and malnutrition. Shachnow fled west after the Soviets invaded Kaunas from the Nazis and began to implement Communism. His 2,000-mile, six-month journey across Europe, mostly on foot, took him across Lithuania, Poland, Czechoslovakia, Hungary, Austria, and finally to American-occupied Nuremberg, Germany, where he hoped to obtain a visa to the United States. To make a living in war-torn Nuremberg, Shachnow resorted to pirating black market contraband such as nylon stockings and chocolate. It was during this time that he learned to speak German.

Visa and immigration
In 1950, Shachnow obtained a visa and immigrated to Salem, Massachusetts, where he attended school for the first time in his life. He took English lessons and worked in the evenings after school to help support the family financially. Just before graduation, he enlisted in the U.S. Army on January 10, 1955. As a sergeant first class, he entered Officer Candidate School and received his commission in the U.S. Army Infantry on April 12, 1960.

Special Forces and Vietnam
In 1962 he volunteered for the United States Army Special Forces, also known as the "Green Berets", where he served for the next thirty-two years. After joining Special Forces, Shachnow was promoted to captain and assigned as commander of Detachment A-121, his group was deployed to Vietnam's An Long Camp near the Cambodian border along the Mekong River.

Shachnow earned his first Silver Star for combat action there as well as a Purple Heart. He was shot in the leg and the arm simultaneously. After being shot, he applied a tourniquet to his leg and continued to fight, lead and care for his men in battle. He recovered from his wounds and returned home only to be diagnosed with the tuberculosis, typhoid fever and several other illnesses from which he eventually recovered.

After recovering, he earned his bachelor's degree from the University of Nebraska, and the Army promoted him to major. He couldn't attend the graduation ceremonies; he received deployment orders for his second tour to Vietnam. The army assigned Shachnow to the 101st Airborne Division, the Screaming Eagles, where he earned his second Silver Star for gallantry in action after escaping death several times.

Cold War, Berlin, Delta Force
In the 1970s he served as commander of Det-A, Berlin Brigade, a clandestine unit of Cold War Special Forces soldiers on high alert 24-hours a day. This covert unit was made up of selectively trained and language qualified members of Special Forces, as well as many Eastern European immigrants who brought much-needed culture, geographical and language skills to the assignment. Their missions were classified; they dressed in civilian clothing made in East and West Germany and carried appropriate non-American documentation and identification. Within Special Forces, they were referred to as "Stay Behind" Teams, the detachments that would stay behind if the Soviet Union ever attacked the West. Their mission was the traditional SF mission, that of Unconventional Warfare (UW), to aid those who were subjugated by an occupying force, and assist those who would rebel against the Soviets (...to teach indigenous people basic warfare tactics and weapons use, and lead them in operations against the enemy, conducting guerrilla warfare). Many of its members later went on to help form Delta Force (Det A did not itself become Delta Force). Shachnow's status grew as Special Forces grew, rising to the rank of Major General, receiving both a masters and an honorary doctoral degree along the way. He traveled the world, from Vietnam to the Middle East, Africa, Europe, Korea and back to Germany for the fall of the Berlin Wall.

Education
Shachnow attended the Benjamin Franklin Institute of Technology in Boston. While in the Army, he earned a bachelor's degree in business administration from the University of Nebraska, a Master of Science in public administration from Shippensburg State College in Pennsylvania. He also graduated from the Executive Management Program at Harvard University.

Retirement

Shachnow retired from the Army in 1994, at the age of 60, after 40 years of active-duty service.

Sidney Shachnow has been an honorary member of Rotary Club Berlin-Luftbruecke (Berlin-Airlift) since March 13, 1990.

Shachnow was inducted as a Distinguished Member of the Special Forces Regiment in 2007. He was posthumously awarded the Bull Simons Award in 2019.

Autobiography "Hope and Honor"
In 2004, Shachnow authored Hope and Honor, an autobiographical account of his childhood experience in the Nazi Kovno concentration camp of Lithuania, his immigration and assimilation to the United States and his 40-year career in the U.S. Army, Special Forces.

Politics
On September 6, 2016 he endorsed Republican presidential nominee Donald Trump, though he was publicly critical of some of Trump's foreign policy proposals.

Death
Shachnow, who lived in Southern Pines, North Carolina, died on September 28, 2018. He was married to Arlene for 63 years and they had four daughters. Shachnow was interred at Arlington National Cemetery on February 12, 2019.

Service history

Assignments and commands
Maj. Gen. Shachnow's past assignments have been as commander or staff officer with Infantry, Mechanized Infantry, Airmobile, Airborne and Special Forces units. Gen. Shachnow's most recent assignments include:
Commanding General, John F. Kennedy Special Warfare Center and School, Airborne, Fort Bragg (1992–1994)
Commanding General, United States Army Special Forces Command, Airborne, Fort Bragg
Commanding General, U.S. Army Berlin
Director, Washington Office, United States Special Operations Command, Airborne
Deputy Commanding General, 1st Special Operations Command, Airborne, Fort Bragg
Chief of Staff, 1st Special Operations Command, Airborne, Fort Bragg

Awards and decorations

References
Maj. Gen. Sidney Shachnow, USA (ret.) Biography at Jewish Institute for National Security Affairs website.

External links

1934 births
2018 deaths
People from Kaunas
United States Army generals
United States Army personnel of the Vietnam War
Members of the United States Army Special Forces
Recipients of the Distinguished Service Medal (US Army)
University of Nebraska alumni
Shippensburg University of Pennsylvania alumni
Recipients of the Silver Star
Recipients of the Legion of Merit
Recipients of the Gallantry Cross (Vietnam)
Recipients of the Air Medal
American people of Lithuanian-Jewish descent
Jewish American military personnel
United States Army Rangers
Recipients of the Defense Superior Service Medal
Kovno Ghetto inmates
21st-century American Jews
People from Southern Pines, North Carolina
Burials at Arlington National Cemetery